Toni Tervonen (born 14 March 1977) is a retired Finnish football defender.

References

1977 births
Living people
Finnish footballers
Kuopion Palloseura players
FinnPa players
FK Haugesund players
Kotkan Työväen Palloilijat players
FC Jokerit players
Association football defenders
Finnish expatriate footballers
Expatriate footballers in Norway
Finnish expatriate sportspeople in Norway
Norwegian First Division players
Finland under-21 international footballers
Finland international footballers